Stelis bifalcis is a species of orchid plant native to Costa Rica.

References 

bifalcis
Flora of Costa Rica
Plants described in 1918